Hyloscirtus is a genus of Neotropical frogs in the family Hylidae. This genus was resurrected in 2005 following a major revision of the Hylidae, with the  distinguishing features being 56 transformations in nuclear and mitochondrial proteins and ribosomal genes. Of these species, 28 species, previously placed in the genus Hyla, were moved to this genus. The fingers and toes of these frogs have wide dermal fringes.

They are primarily found in foothill and mountain forests in the Andes, ranging from Bolivia to Venezuela, but a few species occur in adjacent lowlands or páramo, and two (H. colymba and H. palmeri) are found in Panama and Costa Rica. They are typically found near streams where they breed. Several species in this genus are seriously threatened by habitat loss, pollution, introduced species (predation by introduced trout), and the chytrid fungus Batrachochytrium dendrobatidis.

Species
As of February, 2023 there are 40 recognized species in this genus:

AmphibiaWeb also lists Hyloscirtus estevesi, which the Amphibian Species of World, following Barrio-Amorós and colleagues (2019), treats as synonym of Hyloscirtus jahni.

References

Cophomantinae
 
Páramo fauna
Amphibian genera
Taxa named by Wilhelm Peters